The M. Star is a VLCC oil tanker operated by the Japanese company Mitsui O.S.K. Lines. It was launched in December 2008.

July 2010 event 
The M. Star was damaged by an explosion on 27 July 2010, injuring one member of the ship's crew.

The UAE initially said the M. Star was damaged by a "freak wave" from an earthquake. Mitsui officials said, however, that they believed the explosion was caused by a terrorist attack. In August, the UAE said the blast was probably caused by an attack, possibly a suicide bomber in a speedboat. Radar had picked up a suspicious craft near the tanker just before the attack, and traces of explosives were found on the hull.

On November 22, 2010, the United States Maritime Administration confirmed that the blast was the result of a terrorist attack.

References 

Oil tankers
Tankers of Japan
Terrorist incidents against shipping
Ship bombings
Maritime incidents in 2010
Terrorist incidents in Asia in 2010
2008 ships